This is a list of episodes for season 2 of Deadliest Warrior.

Season 2 was announced by the Team and by Spike, along with a video game. A teaser image posted on Twitter shows a Ballistic Gel torso behind a podium. A teaser video was posted for Deadliest Warrior for the people who signed up for Warrior Den with some of the weapons for season 2. The weapons trailer only showed modern weapons. Season 2 premiered April 20, 2010, at 10 pm ET.

Episode 10: SWAT vs. GSG 9

Results

For Short Range weapons, the GSG 9 team used the Remington 870, a pump shotgun with a slower cycle than the SWAT's semiautomatic Benelli M4 Super 90. In the first test, the SWAT team destroyed its six targets in less time. In the second test, the GSG 9 was far more devastating and accurate, destroying the target's head in 17.35 seconds. The Benelli was also accurate, delivering a kill in every shot, and making it in 11.25 seconds. Finishing their target during both tests in less time gave the advantage to the SWAT team's Benelli.
For Mid Range weapons, each team ran a simulation: rescue a hostage from three enemies, while securing three bystanders. The GSG 9 experts, armed with the HK G36 Assault rifle, completed their simulation in 1 minute and 27 seconds. The SWAT team completed the course in 1 minute and 20 seconds. The SWAT's LWRC-PSD utilized higher caliber bullets, and therefore killed with much more damage in less time; earning it the advantage in middle-ranged weapons.
For Long Range weapons, the SWAT team's Remington 700 destroyed the skull of its target by shooting it through the left eye. The GSG 9's HK PSG1, however, was able to kill its target by shooting it through the right eye; saving the hostage from kidnapping and being spattered in blood. In addition, the PSG1 was more accurate in hitting its target by a fraction of an inch, so it earned the advantage in long-ranged weapons.
For special weapons, the GSG 9 stingball grenade was deployed and the rubber balls successfully made numerous indentations on a wall, none of which were judged to be fatal (or were even likely to break the skin). The SWAT team's Taser shockwave is a weapon composed of 36 Tasers mounted together. At 25 feet, it managed hit all five of its targets while only deploying half of its arsenal. During a test of a single Taser, it was able to bring down its live target without causing any significant injury. Since the Taser was accurate and could be used more than once (if a suspect continued to resist), while stingball grenade carried a risk of collateral damage when deployed, the Taser won the special weapons advantage. The Taser was the first and only weapon on Deadliest Warrior to be tested on a living subject.
This is the first squad on squad battle that featured four on four instead of the traditional five on five.
This is the first match which does not have melee weapons.
SWAT is one of only three warriors to receive the edge in 3 out of 4 weapons match-ups (the Maori Warrior and Vlad the Impaler being the others).
SWAT is one of six warriors with no battle cry at the end.
SWAT is the fifth of fourteen warriors to win after scoring more kills at mid range and long range.
The SWAT leader has claimed the most human kills in a four-on-four squad match, with three kills.
The HK PSG1 and the Benelli M4 Super 90 are the fifth and sixth weapons to be given the edge and score fewer kills than the opposing weapons.
True to their billing as non-lethal weapons, the stingball grenade and the Taser shockwave successfully incapacitated one opponent each but neither scored any kills in the simulation. They are the fourth and fifth weapons not to score kills.
The taser shockwave is the only weapon to be given the edge and score no kills. It is also the only weapon on the show to be tested on a living human volunteer.

Reenactment 10

The battle begins with the SWAT team's armored van parking near a series of abandoned buildings and parked cars. The squad's captain looks into his binoculars and sees 4 GSG 9 members approaching from the other side of the area. The SWAT team splits up, with 3 of the members going off in different directions and the leader setting himself down to set up his Remington 700 sniper rifle. The GSG 9 also split up, with each team going into different buildings. In one building, a member of the SWAT team sets up his taser shockwave and hides in another room. A GSG 9 member enters the same warehouse, gun in hand. The SWAT team member watches as the GSG 9 member slowly crosses the room, then pushes a button on his remote. The taser shockwave shoots out hooks that latch on to the GSG 9 member and electrically shock him. A nearby GSG 9 hears the commotion and runs in to find his teammate dazed and on the floor. He sees the cord connecting the taser to the remote control and follows it to the next room. The SWAT member tries to shoot the GSG 9 man with his LWRC PSD, but misses and is shot himself with the HK G36. The GSG 9 member then proceeds to remove the taser hooks from his teammate. The two exit the building, deciding on which building to enter next. The SWAT team captain sees them and shoots one with the sniper rifle, causing the other to flee. He runs up to the roof of a building, sets up his HK PSG1 sniper rifle, and begins to search for a SWAT team member to shoot at. Down below, a SWAT team member is chased into a building by two GSG 9 members. The two GSG 9 members approach the building, where the SWAT team member tries to shoot them from inside with his Benelli M4 shotgun. One of them tries to fire back with his Remington 870 shotgun, but misses. He pulls out a Stingball Grenade and throws it into the room. It explodes right next to the SWAT member, throwing him to the floor. The GSG 9 member then quickly runs in and dispatches him. He enters the next room and finds an exit, only to be shot by a SWAT member and his LWRC PSD. The GSG 9 member on the roof sees this and shoots him with his sniper rifle. However, he is spotted by the SWAT team captain and is picked off by the SWAT's sniper rifle. The SWAT team captain then gets up and runs for cover, with the last GSG 9 member not too far behind. He hides on the hill behind the SWAT van, slowly approaching it with his Remington 870 shotgun. He opens it from the back, only to find it empty. The SWAT captain, hiding in a parked 4X4 steps out with his Benelli M4. The GSG 9 member turns around and tries to fire his gun, but the SWAT team captain shoots first and kills him. The SWAT captain slowly approaches the GSG 9 member to make sure he is dead, then turns and removes his goggles.

Winner: SWAT

Episode 11: Attila the Hun vs. Alexander the Great

Results

This episode marked the first time combat on horseback was factored into a warrior's combat skills and effectiveness.
For Short-Range weapons, Attila's Sword of Mars went up against Alexander's kopis. When both were tested on horseback (on both stationary and moving targets), the Sword of Mars dealt four killing blows in 34.5 seconds. With the head targets, the Sword of Mars caused a decapitation on one meat "neck" and cut through the cervical muscles to the spinal cord on the other. On the slabs of cattle meat, the Sword of Mars managed to slice four inches through the ribs (which are two to three times thicker than human ribs), causing two death blows. The kopis completed the test in 25.75 seconds; the kopis decapitated one meat "neck" and cut through the spinal cord on the other. However, the kopis failed to penetrate the cattle ribs, inflicting a collapsed lung at most. The Sword of Mars received the edge due to killing power.
For Mid-Range weapons, Attila's lasso took on Alexander's xyston lance. The xyston was tested against a pig carcass on a zip-line to simulate the weapon's use on horseback. The xyston impaled the pig at 10 feet/second with almost no resistance. The xyston was also tested from horseback on an armoured carcass and was able to puncture through the front plate, impale the carcass through the sternum, and still puncture the back plate. The lasso could cause a hangman's fracture of the neck and crush the trachea, but was still determined to not be a certain kill. The edge was given to the Xyston due to its raw killing power.
For Long-Range weapons, Attila's hunnic composite bow was put up against Alexander's gastraphetes belly-bow. Both were tested on two moving targets. The composite bow was used from horseback, and demonstrated both speed and accuracy. The gastraphetes was tested on foot and could not match the speed or the accuracy of the composite bow. After this test, the hosts gave the edge to the composite bow.
For Special Weapons, Alexander's ballista was tested against Attila's scythian axe. The ballista was fired at a silhouette target of a mounted Hun at 200 yards, and hit its target at 198 mph. The ballista was also tested against a formation of enemies, and caused instant kills by impaling them. The scythian axe was tested against an unprotected ballistic gel head, tearing the back of the skull completely open, decapitating the skull, and severing the spinal cord with multiple strikes. The velocity of the Scythian Axe was measured at 69 mph. However, the axe failed to penetrate Alexander's iron helmet, and could only strike the helmet with roughly 20 pounds of force per square inch; 81 pounds per square inch being the minimum amount of force required to inflict a lethal skull fracture. The edge went to the ballista because of its range, killing power, and the Scythian Axe's failure.
The Greek sport of Pankration was also tested by the Alexander team. Rashad Evans was able to easily crush the trachea and fracture the skull of a ballistic gel torso with only his elbow and knee, respectively.
This is the first episode to feature multiple warriors on each team in an ancient match, and the only one where a member of the losing team is not known to be killed (Attila and his men were not seen killing one of Alexander's soldiers, so either he escaped or was simply not seen dying).
Attila's hunnic composite bow scored the most kills of any pre-gunpowder projectile weapon of the first two seasons.
The Sword of Mars and the ballista are the seventh and eighth weapons to be given the edge and score fewer kills than the opposing weapons.

Reenactment 11

The battle begins with two of Alexander's men (with the warrior-king himself behind on horseback) pushing a ballista towards a ruined city. Inside the city, Attila and two men sit, eating a meal. As the Macedonian soldiers crank the ballista, birds fly off, warning the Huns off something wrong. Given the order, the Macedonians load and fire the ballista. The bolt sails into a Hun who had just risen to investigate and ironically, walking directly into it. Attila and his men get up and watch as Alexander (holding a Xyston) and his two men (one with a belly-bow, the other a Kopis) run down the small hill toward them. Aided by his other man, Attila mounts his horse, takes up a bow, and rides back a few feet. The belly-bowman arrives first, quickly pulling the string up, but Attila's man fires his own composite bow, killing him. Alexander moves to the Hun, charging at him with his Xyston. Attila draws his bow and fires at Alexander, but the bronze cuirass shatters the arrow. Alexander rides by Attila's bowman, impaling him with the Xyston and giving a shout of satisfaction. Attila rides in with a lasso and tries to throw it around the neck of his foe, but Alexander catches it. He pulls Attila off his horse and after a struggle, Attila does the same to him. The Great runs over to his fallen bowman and grabs his shield. Attila, Scythian axe and shield in hand, bounds toward him. Clashing, Alexander knocks Attila's shield from his hands with a Kopis. Attila falls back, but when Alexander comes up and thrusts at The Hun, Attila sucks his stomach in, avoiding the sword. Turning to the pick side of the axe, Attila gives a mighty swing and punctures a hole through the bronze shield. Alexander discards the shield as Attila draws the Sword of Mars. They cross blades, with Attila cutting Alexander's right arm. Attila charges Alexander who has dropped his Kopis but catches the Hun, and throws him to the ground. The two start fighting with their bare hands, until Alexander throws Attila onto the floor. Attila spots his sword on the floor and scrambles to retrieve his sword. Alexander grabs Attila's leg and tries to pull him away from the sword, but Attila kicks Alexander in the face. He tries once again to grab his sword and succeeds. Alexander approaches Attila and is promptly stabbed through the neck. Attila thrusts his sword in the air and yells in victory.

Winner: Attila the Hun

Episode 12: Jesse James vs. Al Capone

Results

This was the first modern fight with individual warriors and their men.
For short-range weapons, Al Capone's stiletto knife was tested against Jesse James' bowie knife. The Stiletto was used to give a ballistics gel torso a "rat's smile", cut through the carotid artery and the windpipe, stab through the stomach and pierce the lower intestine, and stab between the ribs and into the heart. The stiletto's impact speed was measured at 16.5 feet per second. The bowie knife was capable of disemboweling a pig carcass; cutting through ribs and exposing the kidneys as well as being able to be thrown. While the impact speed of the bowie knife was also measured, the results were not revealed on the show. Even though the bowie knife caused more damage, the stiletto knife was given the edge because of its concealability and speed.
For mid-range weapons, Jesse James' Colt pistols were tested in a recreation of a 19th-century bank, where they expended 12 rounds and made three multiple-hit kills in under seven seconds, with a drawing time of one quarter second. Among the recorded kills was a bullet wound through the cheekbone and brain stem, and a bullet wound which severed the left ventricle. Al Capone's Thompson sub-machine gun was tested on three targets as well. It expended 50 rounds and shot all three targets in six seconds with two kill shots and a mortal liver wound. The Colt pistols were also tested on horseback and the Thompson in a 1929 Hudson Super 6 simulating the vehicles of the each warrior's time. The Colt pistols shot three of the five targets, two kill shots and a disarming arm wound. The Thompson was tested in the Hudson with identical results. The edge was given to the Thompson due to its ability to put more rounds into its targets.
For long-range weapons, Al Capone's Mk 2 "Pineapple" Grenade was tested against Jesse James' Winchester rifle. Both the pressure wave and fragmentation of the grenade were devastating, but the grenade only killed three of its four targets, and had the added disadvantage of a five-second fuse. The Winchester rifle was able to kill all four of its targets in less time than the grenade. The edge was given to the Winchester because of its greater speed, range, and accuracy.
For special weapons, Al Capone's brass knuckles were tested against Jesse James' pistol whip. The brass knuckles were shown to double the force of a punch from 41 psi to 75 psi. The brass knuckles also managed to fracture a naked skull with one hit and cause a depressed skull fracture in three hits. The pistol whip took only one strike to break through a naked skull with a force of 182 psi (more than double that of the brass knuckles). For this reason, the edge was given to the pistol whip.
This is the first match-up that features warriors of the same nationality (American).
This is the first episode where one weapon is used in two different categories, as well as an attack being listed as a weapon (Jesse James' revolvers were used to shoot and bludgeon).
This is the first episode that each of the warrior squads talk in the second season.
This is the second squad on squad battle that featured four on four instead of the traditional five on five.
This is the first battle where a small beep accompanies the counter, indicating that a warrior is dead.
Al Capone is the third warrior to lose despite having the most effective weapon in the fight, which was the Tommy Gun.
The stiletto is the ninth weapon to be given the edge and score fewer kills than the opposing weapon.
This is the only episode with two survivors on the winning team in the fight scene, as well as the only episode where one of the primary named warriors did not deal the finishing blow.

Reenactment 12

The battle begins in an American history museum in Chicago hosting an exhibit about Old West outlaws. Inside, Jesse James, his brother Frank James, and two other gang members are in the Civil War exhibit, breaking the glass exhibits and arming themselves with Colt revolvers and looting some of the Civil War coins. Meanwhile, Al Capone and three of his men drive up to the museum, alerting the James Gang who have finished loading up their newly acquired revolvers. Suspecting intruders, Jesse, Frank, and the gangmen take up positions, ready to fight. The Capone Gang enter and, while marveling the exhibit, are suddenly ambushed by the James Gang. Jesse's team score the first kill in the quick draw showdown. A hailstorm of bullets ensues as both factions open fire on each other, with a Capone flunky taking out one of Jesse's men out with a Tommy gun. Amidst the gunfire, Jesse James's other henchman steals a Winchester rifle from one of the cabinets and lays down some suppressing fire while Jesse and Frank retreat further into the museum. Al Capone's men come out of cover and begin chasing them, with Capone dusting off his hat and following close behind. Jesse's rifleman stops in a hallway and cocks the Winchester, shooting one of Capone's two remaining men as he rounds the corner. Frustrated, Capone's other henchman tries to shoot down the outlaw, fruitlessly firing in all directions. The man then turns and shouts, "Boss, let's go!" Capone catches up and the two men begin to run after Jesse James's crew. The third man struggles to catch up, but is stabbed from behind by Frank, who emerges from a dark closet with the Bowie knife. In an office, Jesse and his gunman hear Capone coming, and the gang member tells Jesse to run while he holds them off. Capone and his last cohort enter the office, where Jesse and his henchman are waiting for them. Jesse shoots Capone's man with the revolver, catching him off guard. Capone quickly ducks for cover behind a desk right before the rifleman finishes the last man on Capone's team with a shot from the Winchester. The rifleman waits for Capone to make his move, unaware that Capone is pulling the pin from his MK2 "Pineapple" Grenade. He hurls the grenade over the desk and quickly hides again. The rifleman attempts to shoot Capone, but is killed by the explosion of the Pineapple Grenade before he gets a chance. Capone gets up and tries to steal one of the revolvers, but Jesse James shoots it out of Capone's hand. Realizing he has been beat, Capone slowly stands up with his hands in the air. Jesse James sneers as he pulls the triggers on his revolvers, only to find that both of his guns are out of bullets. Jesse quickly flees while the infuriated Capone pulls off his trench coat and gloves and puts on a pair brass knuckles, intent on killing Jesse. Jesse runs for his life, but is cornered when he winds up at an exhibit for a western jail cell. He turns around to see that Capone has caught up. He tries to pistol whip Capone, but Capone blocks the swing and counters with a punch in the gut with the brass knuckles. Removing his hat, Capone forces Jesse into the mock jail cell and begins to brutally beat Jesse. After kicking James to the floor, Capone draws his Stiletto while Jesse gets up with his Bowie knife at hand. Al goes in for a thrust, but Jesse hooks his hand with the stock of the revolver and stabs Capone at his arm. Enraged, Capone then kicks James as he drops his stiletto, forcing Jesse to also drop his knife. Capone grabs James and continues to attack him with the knuckles. He slams him face first into the bars. Jesse smiles, apparently having seen something through the bars that Capone doesn't. Capone turns James around and knocks him down with another punch. Right as Capone is about to deliver the killing blow, he hears a gun cock. He looks up to see Frank James with a Winchester. Frank fires the gun, hitting Capone dead center between the eyes. Jesse James dusts off his hat and shouts "Yee-ha!" in victory as Frank smiles. The two brothers hug each other and then run off to steal whatever they can from the museum.

Winner: Jesse James

Episode 13: Aztec Jaguar vs. Zande Warrior

Results

For short-range weapons, the Zande Warrior's  took the edge over the Aztec Jaguar's  sacrificial knife. In the test, both weapons were demonstrated as execution weapons. The makraka's precision while beheading the ballistics dummy gave it the edge.
For mid-range weapons, the Aztec Jaguar's  took the edge over the Zande Warrior's . The  was tested on a ballistic gel horse head, in which the head was sawed-off using three strikes. It is pointed out that the  inflicted tearing wounds as opposed to cutting wounds; with the former causing greater bleedout. Shards of obsidian were embedded in the gel, indicating the weapon would cause more damage if it hit. For the makrigga, the weapon was tested on a 300-pound piece of beef filled with animal blood and entrails. The weapon went through the beef, and with the weapon's spiked barbs pulled out entrails when it was pulled out. The , nicknamed "the obsidian chainsaw" by Geiger, was given the edge due to its greater destructive power.
The test demonstrated the kpinga's ability to use angular velocity by doing vertical throws at a crowd of warriors, one armed with a shield. The Kpinga maneuvered and deflected off the enemy shield and struck another target. Later, the weapon was tested using a horizontal toss to cut through pork leg stand-ins. The weapon was capable of hitting targets at great distances, and capable of piercing the Zande shield to kill its target. However, the Kpinga proved to have more killing potential with multiple blades on the weapon; giving it the edge.
For special weapons, the Aztec Jaguar's  took the edge over the Zande Warrior's botto and pima. The  was tested on skulls, and only three of the five skulls were hit. Further analysis showed some of the hits were not fatal. The botto and pima did not fare well during its test either. Despite the arrows being poison tipped, they could not penetrate the Jaguar's cotton armor, preventing the poison from taking effect.
The  is the only sling to be given the edge, and is also the only one to score more than one kill.
The  is the tenth weapon to be given the edge and score fewer kills than the opposing weapon.
The Zande Warrior is the second warrior with at least one metal weapon to triumph over a warrior who has none.

Reenactment 13

The battle starts with an Aztec Jaguar and Zande Warrior each making their way to the top of rocky hills. The Aztec Jaguar sets his  by a rock, and then climbs to the top of the hill. The two warriors eye each other, waiting for the other to strike. The Zande Warrior yells out a battle cry which echoes throughout the area. This prompts the Aztec Jaguar to raise his  and  arrow. He hurls the Tlacochtli, which sails across the air and barely misses the Zande Warrior. He tries again, and succeeds in hitting the Zande's shield. The Zande Warrior removes the arrow from the shield and puts his Makrigga Spear on the ground. He pulls out his Botto and Pima and climbs down the hill to run towards the Aztec Jaguar. The Jaguar sets up another Tlacochtli and throws it, missing the Zande Warrior again. He fires an arrow in retaliation and hits the Aztec Jaguar in the chest, but the arrow does not penetrate the cotton armor. The Aztec Jaguar sees the Zande Warrior rush towards him and pulls out the arrow from his cotton armor and then climbs down from his hill and prepares his . He swings it around and hurls a rock at the Zande Warrior, but misses him yet again. The Zande Warrior pulls out a Kpinga and throws it at the Aztec Jaguar. It strikes his leg and forces him to the ground. He gets up and begins to flee from the Zande. He runs behind a rock and picks up his . He swings again and knocks off the Zande Warrior's headdress. He swings a third time, and slashes the chest. The Zande Warrior pulls out his  and knocks the  out of the Aztec's hands. He swings the Makraka at him, but it gets lodged in the Aztec's helmet. He struggles to free his weapon, but the Aztec Jaguar quickly reacts by slashing across the Zande's hip with his Tecpatl knife. The Zande Warrior falls to the ground in pain and begins rolling down the hill. The Aztec Jaguar removes his helmet, picks up his  and begins chasing the Zande Warrior, who is now back on his feet. The Zande Warrior rushes back to the top of his hill and runs back to the Makrigga Spear he put down earlier. The Aztec Warrior catches up and prepares to swing his , but the Zande Warrior quickly turns around and thrusts the  into the Jaguar's stomach. The Aztec stops in his tracks and begins spitting blood from his mouth. The Zande then pulls out the makrigga, yanking out a chunk of the Aztec's innards. The Aztec falls back and off the hill, dropping into the field below. The Zande Warrior pumps his fists into the air, yelling in victory.

Winner: Zande Warrior

Episode 14: Nazi Waffen SS vs. Viet Cong

Results

For short-range weapons, the Mauser C-96 was tested against the Tokarev TT-33 in eliminating five targets. The TT-33 managed to eliminate the targets in 24 seconds with eight shots, while the C-96 eliminated the targets with 10 shots in only 12 seconds. The Mauser C-96's automatic fire capability was then demonstrated, emptying a full magazine in less than a second. The edge was given to the Mauser C-96 for its 20-round capacity and secondary autofire option.
For long-range weapons, the MP 28 was tested against the MAT-49. It was determined that both SMGs performed almost equally in eliminating three targets in 30 seconds, resulting in a draw.
For explosive weapons, the Bouncing Betty was tested against the F-1 Grenade-POMZ-2 Combination. The Bouncing Betty destroyed 4 targets and had an effective fragmentation radius of 15 yards while the F-1 Grenade decimated a pig carcass after its POMZ-2 host mine had been disarmed and removed. The edge was given to the F-1 Grenade and POMZ-2 Combination due to its anti-handling nature.
For special weapons, the punji stakes were tested against the Flammenwerfer 41. The punji pit trap could still kill by infection if the victim did not fall in face first, while the punji spike ball trap could penetrate deep enough to hit vital organs. The Flammenwerfer 41 eliminated a group of targets and burned down a hut in the brief span of a few seconds. The edge was given to the Flammenwerfer 41, since it did not require its victims to fall in or activate a trip wire to be effective, and was capable of clearing out areas and neutralizing booby traps, thus preventing any form of surprise attacks.
This is the fifth episode to have a tie in weapons edges.
This is the only match up not to feature mid-range weapons, and the second to not have melee weapons.
Despite the fact that they were not included in the weapons testing, rifles were used by both squads during the simulation (possibly the K98k and SKS).
This is the first match-up where every tested weapon killed someone in the final battle.

Reenactment 14

The battle begins with members of a Viet Cong cell bringing in the beaten leader of the Nazi Waffen SS team as a prisoner. He is tossed to the ground and kicked around. Up ahead, the rest of the Nazi Waffen SS team is sneaking up on the Viet Cong's campsite to try to rescue their leader, setting up a Bouncing Betty along the way. The Viet Cong leader points his Tokarev TT-33 at the German while interrogating him in Vietnamese. The Nazi leader only responds by spitting at the Vietnamese's face. The angered Viet Cong leader cocks his Tokarev and prepares to execute the Waffen SS leader, but the rest of the Waffen SS squad jumps in and fires at the camp with MP 28 submachine guns and bolt-action rifles. The VC leader takes cover as one VC operative is killed and the Viet Cong team scrambles for their weapons as a skirmish ensues. In the confusion, the Nazi leader manages to escape from the clutches of the Viet Cong and rush into the jungle. One VC concentrates its fire and kills a Nazi soldier with his MAT-49 submachine gun. Seeing the VC soldiers become more assembled, the other Nazis fall back into the jungle as the rest of the Viet Cong gives chase. In the jungle, the Nazi leader runs into one of his fellow soldiers who gives him a Mauser C-96 pistol. The soldier leads on through the jungle, but quickly falls into a Punji Stake pit, which kills him. The Waffen SS leader grimaces as he watches his comrade fall and sees his still-twitching corpse. He turns around and sees two Viet Cong soldiers closing in, so he quickly runs further into the jungle. In another area, two more Viet Cong are catching up to two other Waffen SS soldiers. The two Waffen SS and a Viet Cong safely pass by a planted Bouncing Betty, but the second Viet Cong is killed when it pops up. The two Waffen SS make their way to a small river. As one of them tries to cross, he trips a wire and activates the POMZ-2 mine which kills him. The other Nazi jumps across the river and kills an oncoming Viet Cong soldier with his MP 28 as he approaches the river. Meanwhile, the German leader kills one of the two remaining Viet Cong members with his Mauser pistol and then makes his way across a small bridge over the river. The Viet Cong leader tries to follow, but is spotted by the other Waffen SS soldier. He attempts to shoot the last Viet Cong with his MP 28, but runs out of ammo and is shot by the Viet Cong leader's Tokarev. The two remaining leaders then exchange fire with each other with their pistols until both guns are depleted. The Waffen SS leader then finds his team's Kubelwagen and runs to it, finding a Flammenwerfer 41 flamethrower in the back. While the Viet Cong leader is loading a fresh magazine into his gun, his Nazi counterpart ducks for cover behind the car and straps on the flamethrower. The Viet Cong leader reloads and fires at the Kubelwagen while screaming in Vietnamese, but the Waffen SS leader jumps out from behind the car and shoots a burst of fire at him. The Viet Cong leader is set ablaze, fires one wild shot into the air, and slumps to the ground, screaming before dying. The Waffen SS leader examines the still-burning corpse, and then yells "Deutschland!" in victory.

Winner: Nazi Waffen SS

Episode 15: Roman Centurion vs. Rajput Warrior

Results

For short-range weapons, the gladius was tested against the khanda. The gladius was capable of chopping off arms (cutting cleanly through the bone), stabbing through the liver and through a rib and into the lung, and through a clavicle, while the khanda cut through five ribs on one cattle carcass, through the spine and through both sides of the ribcage on the second, and through the femur on the third. During the gladius test a scutum was also used in the fighting techniques but it was revealed on the aftermath episode that this was a strictly sword vs. sword comparison in terms of killing power. The edge was given to the khanda for its tremendous cutting power and longer blade.
For mid-range weapons, the aara was tested against the pilum. The aara, when wielded against three targets, was only able to kill one and inflict minor injuries on the other two. The pilum, however, penetrated three blood bags and one Rajput shield. The edge was given to the pilum for its flexible killing potential as a spear and a throwing projectile.
For long-range weapons, the chakrams were tested against the scorpion. The chakram severed a simulated neck while the scorpion demonstrated its superior range by delivering four kills at 25 yards and one kill at 50 yards. The edge was given to the chakram for its portability and faster rate of fire.
For special weapons, the katars were tested against the dolabra. The katar was tested on a suspended pig carcass, impaling the carcass with multiple punches which were measured at over 200 pounds of force. The katar managed to both fracture and cut through the carcass's ribs, and a final blow (delivered with a version of the katar that spread out spring-loaded side blades) completely disemboweled the carcass. On a second pig carcass which was clad in lorica hamata, the katars punctured the carcass with four punches, the lorica hamata offering only slightly more resistance than the naked flesh of the first pig carcass. Dr. Armand Dorian examined the first puncture wound, claiming that it stabbed through the heart and punctured the back, claiming that the lorica hamata was "like a T-shirt to this weapon". The dolabra was tested against a ballistics gel torso clad in a Rajput's coat of 10000 nails. The dolabra's axe-end chopped down vertically onto the torso's left arm, shattering the bone, ripping through the biceps and the triceps, and severing the brachial artery. The axe-end also severed the top half of the skull in one blow, and almost severed the right arm (it fell off a few seconds later). The pick end was used to puncture the coat of 10000 nails twice, breaking a rib and puncturing the heart. Although both weapons were capable of penetrating butted chainmail and delivering killing blows, the edge was given to the dolabra for its longer reach.
The aara is the sixth weapon to score no kills in the simulation.
The dolobra is the eleventh weapon to be given the edge and score fewer kills than the opposing weapon.

Reenactment 15

The battle starts with a Rajput Warrior walking through a forest, investigating a clicking noise being made in the distance. As it turns out, the clicking noise is coming from the Roman Centurion cranking the lever on his Scorpion Crossbow. As the Rajput warrior gets closer and closer, the Roman Centurion loads a bolt into the Scorpion. The Rajput pokes his head from behind a tree and spots the Centurion. The Centurion fires his Scorpion, but the bolt misses the Rajput completely. He then pulls out his Pilum Javelin and charges at the Rajput, causing him to flee. The Centurion makes his way to a more open area, only to be met with one of the Rajput's Chakram discs. The Centurion blocks the Chakram with his shield, and then throws his Pilum. The Rajput, however, pulls out his Khanda sword and slices the Javelin in two. The two warriors glare at each other, waiting for the other to make his move. The Rajput pulls out his Aara sword and whips it around. The Roman Centurion then takes his Dolabra and charges at the Rajput. The Rajput jumps back and tries to strike with his Aara, but the Centurion blocks with his shield. The Centurion lunges at the Rajput and swings his Dolabra, but the Rajput jumps out of the way. He then swings his Aara and coils it around the Centurion's leg. The Centurion completely falls over, but is able to save himself from the Rajput by kicking a log at the Rajput and tripping him. The Centurion gets up with his Dolabra at hand and sees that the Rajput has also gotten up and pulled out his Khanda sword again. The Centurion swings at the Rajput, who moves back to avoid it. However, in doing so, he backs up and falls onto a giant log. The Centurion tries to take advantage and swing at the Rajput, but the Rajput rolls out of the way and causes the Dolabra to get stuck in the log. The Rajput then swings his sword and cuts the head of the Dolabra off from the handle. He prepares to swing at the Centurion, but the loss of the Dolabra's head allows the Centurion to swing the broken handle fast enough to hit the Rajput and knock him over. The Centurion pulls out his Gladius and begins swinging wildly at the Rajput, eventually knocking the Khanda out of his hands. He slashes the Rajput's face and forces him to the ground. He raises his sword and prepares to finish him off, but the Rajput puts on his Katar and stabs the Centurion in the stomach. The Centurion falls in pain, then looks up. The image of the Rajput wielding his Khanda is the last thing the Centurion sees before the Khanda tears into his face and kills him. The Rajput then pumps his fists in the air and yells in victory.

Winner: Rajput Warrior

Episode 16: Somali Pirates vs. Medellin Cartel

Results

For short-range weapons, the machete was tested against the grappling hook. The machete cleaved off the arms and severed the throat of a gel torso as well as demonstrated the Colombian necktie, while the grappling hook ripped into a pig carcass. The edge was given to the machete since the grappling hook was not designed to be a weapon and can cause damage to the user.
For mid-range weapons, the Mini Uzi was tested against the AK-47. The Mini Uzi emptied an entire magazine into two targets inside a car with most of the hits being in the head and neck areas while the AK-47 killed two targets at 50yds and two targets at 100yds while fired from a small skiff. The edge was given to the AK-47 for its longer range and firepower.
For long-range weapons, the M60 was tested against the PKM in eliminating four moving targets. The PKM completed the test in 1m and 43s but jammed once while the M60 completed the test in 1m and 54s but jammed twice. The edge was given to the PKM for its higher rate of fire and better mechanical reliability.
For explosive weapons, the car bomb was tested against the RPG-7. Although the RPG-7 was portable and could be fired repeatedly at a distance, the edge was given to the car bomb for its better chance at killing multiple targets with its larger explosive payload.
This is the third squad on squad battle that featured four on four instead of the traditional five on five.
This is the first battle where a combatant eliminates himself and an opponent in a suicide (Pablo Escobar, who is wounded, detonates a Car Bomb, killing himself and the leader of the Somali Pirates).
The Somali Pirates are the sixth of thirteen warriors to win after scoring more kills at mid range and long range.
The car-bomb is the twelfth weapon to be given the edge and score fewer kills than the opposing weapon.

Reenactment 16

The battle starts with a group of Somali Pirates approaching a warehouse near a pier via motor boat. Inside the warehouse, Pablo Escobar and one of the Medellin Drug Cartel thugs are preparing packages of cocaine while a third member practices swinging his machete and a fourth dances to salsa music while holding an M60 machine gun. Outside, the Somali Pirates dock their boat and swarm on shore towards the warehouse. The head Pirate, armed with an AK-47, and two of his men, armed with a PKM Machine Gun and grappling hook, enter the warehouse while a fourth stays behind, shouldering his RPG-7 rocket launcher. Inside, they see the Cartel men relaxing and Escobar giving one of them a package of cocaine. As the thug goes to put it away, the PKM pirate jumps out and kills him with the machine gun. Escobar, alerted to the gunfire, grabs an Uzi while the dancing thug holds out his M60 machine gun and fires back. In the shadows, the other Cartel thug with the machete tries to sneak up on one of the Somali Pirates while they are distracted by the gunfire. The hook Pirate spots him as he charges and tries to fight back with his Grappling Hook. He parries the oncoming swing and hits the Cartel thug in his stomach. The thug counters in response by amputating the Pirate's hand and then slashing his neck. The lead Somali Pirate hears the commotion and turns and kills the Cartel man with his AK-47 with a single shot to the face. The other Cartel henchman continues to fire his M60, but it gets jammed. He drops it and picks up an Uzi. Both he and Pablo Escobar try to make a run for it. The PKM Pirate tries to shoot Escobar, but misses. The head Pirate signals for him to run after the remaining Cartel members. Escobar runs down stairs, and turns around when he hears the Pirate leader chasing him. The Pirate takes cover behind a corner, and the two begin to exchange gunfire. The Somali Pirate eventually manages to shoot Escobar in the left shoulder, who falls to the floor and lies motionless. The Pirate steps on him as he comes down the stairs and takes his cigar and smokes it in satisfaction. Meanwhile, the other Cartel member climbs up stairs and enters a room. When the other Somali Pirate opens the door, the Cartel thug opens fire with his Uzi and kills him. He sneers at the dead body and spits on it. Meanwhile, the head Pirate sees a car with cocaine and a bag of money. He gets in the driver's seat and begins honking the horn to get the rocket Pirate who chose to stay outside. He hears the horn and makes his way toward the garage. However, the head Pirate is unaware that Pablo Escobar, who is behind the car, is still alive. Escobar struggles to get up, but his wounds are so bad that he cannot. He sees the Pirate in the car and pulls out a remote. He sets himself up with his remaining strength and looks under the car, where a bomb is situated. Realizing that he has no other options, he presses the button on the remote as the other Pirate approaches the garage. The bomb goes off, destroying the car and killing both Escobar and the head Pirate while sending the last Pirate to the asphalt. The last Cartel member hears the explosion and runs for an exit. The Somali Pirate sits up and starts to clean off the debris when he sees the last Cartel member exiting from a door. He stands up and prepares his RPG-7 Rocket Launcher. The Cartel member sees him and desperately tries to go back inside, only to find that the door is locked from the inside and cannot be opened. The Pirate fires the rocket, which flies at the Cartel thug and blows up, obliterating him. The remaining Pirate roars in victory and walks away.

Winner: Somali Pirates

Episode 17: Persian Immortal vs. Celt

Results

This was the first episode where the warrior's performance was affected by chariot.
For short-range weapons, the Celtic long sword was tested against the sagaris. The long sword decapitated a gel torso in three hits at 74 mph, breaking through the spinal cord on the first swing and through the cheekbone on the second swing. Tested against the Persian Immortal's armor, the long sword struck off metal scales with a force of 280 psi, enough to break a rib behind the armor. It cut a gel head through the nose and to the brain from the back of a chariot. With the pick end of the sagaris, Cyrus Zahiri penetrated a ballistics gel torso multiple times, visually breaking through several ribs and puncturing the bottom portion of the heart, causing a very rapid death by bleedout. The sagaris also punctured a curve in the upper intestine, causing waste matter to openly spill into the interior of the abdomen, causing a septic death. Later, the sagaris was tested against a dummy wearing Celtic armor; an iron coolus helmet (with a pressure sensor attached to the head beneath), a large leather belt, and an iron-rimmed wooden shield. The Persian Immortal expert used the sagaris as a fulcrum to pull away the shield, punctured the coolus helmet with the pick end (penetrating the frontal lobe of the brain and generating a force of over 323 psi), stabbed the naked torso, and punctured the leather belt. However, the sagaris only managed to inflict a flesh wound beneath the leather belt, and took several seconds to be removed. The edge was given to the long sword for its faster recovery time.
For mid-range weapons, the lancea was tested against the Persian spear. The lancea went through a pig carcass when it was thrown as a javelin while the Persian spear killed two human-shaped targets from the back of a chariot. The first target was stabbed in the nape of the neck, piercing the carotid artery and the jugular vein and causing death by rapid bleedout. The second target was stabbed directly in the heart and drug behind the chariot for several feet. The edge was given to the Persian spear since it was not a disposable missile weapon, like the lancea, and had a thinner tip to facilitate deeper penetration.
For long-range weapons, the bow and arrow was tested against the sling. The bow and arrow's effective range was 50 yards while the sling delivered two kills and three wounds with five shots. The edge was given to the bow and arrow for its superior range, accuracy, rate of fire, and lethality.
For special weapons, the burda club was tested against the chariot scythe. The burda club exploded seven heads at roughly 273 psi while the chariot scythe failed to kill either of its two pig targets. The edge was given to the burda for its simplicity, portability, and the failure of the chariot scythe.
The Persian Immortal is one of three warriors to get at least 100 kills with each weapon.
This is the most lopsided episode of Season 2.
The Persian Immortal is the seventh warrior of fourteen who won after scoring more kills at mid range and long range.
The burda is the thirteenth weapon to be given the edge and score fewer kills than the opposing weapon.

Reenactment 17

The battle begins in an open field with the Persian Immortal and Celt in their own chariots, each with its own charioteer. The Celt raises his Long Sword and points at the other chariot, signaling his charioteer to advance. The Immortal signals for his chariot to charge as well. As the two chariots race across the field, the Immortal fires an arrow from his bow and hits the Celt's charioteer in his chest. The Persian chariot closes in and breaks one of the Chariot's wheels with a Chariot Scythe. The collision throws the Celt off of his chariot and flips the chariot over. The Celt runs up to the fallen vehicle and grabs his Lancea, choosing to abandon his shield. With a loud battle cry, he charges at the Persian Immortal and his chariot. The Persian fires another arrow, but misses. As he readies another arrow, the Celt throws his Lancea. It misses, but it distracts the Immortal and prevents him from getting a clear shot. The Celt runs past the Persian chariot, vaulting over the incoming Scythe. He grabs his Lancea and tries to distance himself from the chariot. He realizes that it will not do him any good, however, and chooses to discard it in favor of his Sling. The Persian Immortal jumps off his chariot with his spear and shield just before the Celt swings his Sling around and throws a rock. The rock hits the Persian charioteer and knocks him unconscious. The Immortal runs towards the Celt, but the Celt picks up his Lancea just as the Immortal approaches him. He thrusts at the Immortal, knocking his spear out of his hand. The Immortal tries to back off, but the Celt jumps up and kicks him. The Immortal draws his Sagaris axe and glares at the Celt. The two begin to swing at each other, but cannot pull off a successful blow. After a few misses, the Celt aims at the Immortal's thigh and stabs it. The Persian Immortal yells in pain and swings, forcing the Celt to pull out his Lancea. The Immortal tries an overhand swing, but the Celt blocks with his Lancea. The Persian seizes the opportunity to kick him in the stomach and knock him down. The Celt gets back up and draws his Long Sword and Burda club. He distracts the Immortal with the Long Sword, and then hits the Immortal with the club. The Persian Immortal blocks the Long Sword with his Sagaris, but the Celt kicks him again. The Celt tries to finish the fight with a stab, but the Immortal rolls out of the way. He gets back up and swings the Sagaris, but the Celt parries and hits him twice with the Burda Club. The Immortal falls to the floor, but manages to roll over and block the Long Sword with the Sagaris. He gets up and spins around the Sagaris, piercing the Celt's arm. The Celt hits the Sagaris out of the Persian Immortal's hands and leaves him without a weapon. The Immortal runs away, forcing the Celt to chase him down, dropping the Burda from his wounded arm. The Immortal finds his spear laying on the floor and grabs it. He thrusts it at the Celt twice, but misses. The Celt tries to swing the sword downward, but the Immortal flips the Spear over and hits him in the head with the iron counterweight on the bottom of the spear. The Celt throws his head back in pain, giving the Immortal enough time to flip the Spear again and stab the Celt in the chest. He drives the Spear harder through the leather armor and forces the Celt to the floor. The Persian Immortal forces the spear in deeper until blood spews from the Celts mouth. The Persian Immortal then shouts "Parsa!" (Persia) in victory.

Winner: Persian Immortal

Episode 18: K.G.B. vs. C.I.A.

K.G.B. Team: Pavel Ksendz (K.G.B. Operator Descendant), Stass Klassen (Former Russian Military)
K.G.B. Weapons: Shoe Knife, Camera Gun, Skorpion SMG-61, Dead Drop Spike
K.G.B. Armor: None
K.G.B. Statistics: Years Active: 1954-1991, Height: 5 Feet 10 Inches, Weight: 170 Pounds, Missions: Espionage and Sabotage

C.I.A. Team: Mike Baker (Former C.I.A. Agent), Frank Dowse (Former Defense Intelligence)
C.I.A. Weapons: Garrote, Briefcase Gun, MAC-10, Exploding Cigar
C.I.A. Armor: None
C.I.A. Statistics: Years Active: 1947–Present, Height: 5 Feet 11 Inches, Weight: 180 Pounds, Missions: Covert and Paramilitary Ops

For short-range weapons, the shoe knife was tested against the garrote. The shoe knife ripped through a pig carcass and could cause profuse bleeding if it hits an artery or vital organ. The force of a kick with the shoe knife was measured at 605 psi. It was implied that against a real person, the bloodletting would not have been as spectacular as it was on the pig carcass, as most of the bleeding would have been internal. The garrote decapitated a gel torso but was determined to be heavily dependent on a surprise attack from behind. The edge was given to the shoe knife since it was more flexible and less disadvantaged than the garrote.
For mid-range weapons, the briefcase gun was tested against the camera gun. The briefcase gun killed a target with a lethal shot to the liver while the camera gun achieved an instant kill by driving a .22 bullet through the left nostril of a gel head. The edge was given to the briefcase gun since it contained a 9mm PPK which was a heavier caliber and longer range weapon that could be fired multiple times.
For long-range weapons, the MAC-10 was tested against the Skorpion SMG-61 in eliminating five targets. The Skorpion delivered three kills but left one wounded and one alive in 12 seconds while the MAC-10 delivered five kills in 20 seconds. The edge was given to the MAC-10 for its heavier caliber, 30-round magazine, faster rate of fire, and better accuracy.
For explosive weapons, the exploding cigar was tested against the booby-trapped dead drop spike. The cigar completely destroyed the upper and lower jaw of a gel head but was determined to be very unreliable due to its timed fuse and small explosive payload while the explosive trap concealed in the dead drop spike decimated a mannequin. The edge was given to the dead drop spike for its higher success rate at killing a target with its SEMTEX payload and "fail-deadly tamper" trigger.
This is the first, and currently only, episode where every combatant in the final battle has an identity (albeit secret), as well as the first battle to have female combatants.
The C.I.A. is one of six warriors without a battle cry at the end.
The C.I.A. is the eighth of fourteen warriors to win after scoring more kills at mid range and long range.
The female K.G.B. agent (K.G.B. 004) earned 2 kills, making her the first female on the show to kill in the simulation.

Reenactment 18

A C.I.A. Agent (001) is walking up to an embassy of the USSR carrying a briefcase, while a nearby C.I.A. Agent (002) keeps a lookout with binoculars in a nearby van. Behind C.I.A. 001, a Russian K.G.B. Agent (001) shadows him as they walk into the Embassy. Inside, C.I.A. 001 is making a business transaction with K.G.B. 002, a double agent who sells off a roll of camera film for the briefcase full of U.S. currency. With their business done, C.I.A. 001 offers K.G.B. 002 a cigar to which he happily obliges. C.I.A. 001 smirks as K.G.B. 002 takes his last puff and the cigar explodes, blowing off K.G.B. 002's face. C.I.A. 001 slips the film into his vest pocket, grabs the briefcase and leaves the office. In the lobby of the embassy, two K.G.B. Agents (003 and 004) are shooting a film with a camera, while a nearby C.I.A. Agent (003) sits around listlessly with his briefcase. K.G.B. 003 turns to face C.I.A. 001 with the camera and shoots him at point-blank range. Seeing this, C.I.A. 003 immediately stands up and shoots K.G.B. 003 with his briefcase. As K.G.B. 003 falls down dead, K.G.B. 004 pulls out her silenced Skorpion sub-machine gun and fires at C.I.A. 003, shooting him in the back and killing him as he dives behind cover. K.G.B. 004 kneels down to the deceased C.I.A. 001 and steals the camera film as C.I.A. Agents 004 and 005 storm the lobby with silenced MAC 10 submachine guns. K.G.B. 004 gets to an elevator and fires out from cover, impeding the C.I.A. agents' pursuit as the elevator doors close. Inside the elevator, K.G.B. 004 inspects the film and puts it into a Dead Drop Spike. The elevator doors open and K.G.B. 004 comes face-to-face with K.G.B. 001 with both their guns raised at each other. Recognizing each other, the agents lower their weapons and leave as K.G.B. 004 gives 001 the Dead Drop Spike. Outside the embassy, K.G.B. Agent 005 awaits his fellow agents, unaware that he is being watched by C.I.A. 002 from across the street. Back inside the embassy, K.G.B. 001 and 004 are making their way through a kitchen when C.I.A. 004 and 005 catch up to them. The C.I.A. agents open fire, wounding K.G.B. 001 as K.G.B. 004 fires back, shoving the wounded K.G.B. 001 out of the crossfire. C.I.A. 004 and 005 dive for cover behind the counter and move their way up with C.I.A. 005 pushing a serving dolly in front of her. As C.I.A. 005 nears the end of the counter, K.G.B. 004 runs up and gets behind the other side of the dolly, pushing objects down on C.I.A. 005. Both agents stand up and struggle to shoot each other, but K.G.B. 004 gets the upper hand and kills the female C.I.A. agent. While she is still standing, C.I.A. 004 pops out and quickly dispatches the femme fatale with a short burst of machine gun fire. Meanwhile, the wounded K.G.B. 001 agent makes his way upstairs, while C.I.A. 004 pursues closely, following his bloody trail to a nearby restroom. As C.I.A. 004 prepares to inspect a stall, K.G.B. 001 jumps out and engages the agent, clicking his heels together and unsheathing a shoe knife. The K.G.B. agent kicks and manhandles the C.I.A. agent, but C.I.A. 004 manages to retaliate by plunging the MAC into his stomach and firing, killing K.G.B. 001. As K.G.B. 001 slumps against the wall, C.I.A. 004 reaches into his pockets and takes the Dead Drop Spike. He attempts to open it, but fails to open it the correct way and is blown up. Outside, K.G.B. 005 hears the explosion and gets out of his car, stuffing his Skorpion into his coat as he enters the embassy. Across the street, C.I.A. 002 sees the careless agent exiting his car and leaves the safety of his van. Inside the embassy, K.G.B. 005 sees the carnage caused by the now deceased C.I.A. and K.G.B. agents. With the film roll destroyed and the C.I.A. killed in action, the K.G.B. agent returns to his car, unaware that C.I.A. 002 is lying in wait. As K.G.B. 005 attempts to start his car, C.I.A. 002 pops out from the back seat with a garrote wire and strangles the K.G.B. agent. The agent struggles helplessly as the wire cuts into his neck, then relaxes into death and slumps against the seat. His job finished, the C.I.A. agent exits the car, wiping his bloodied hands with a towel and adjusting his scarf as he walks away.

Winner: C.I.A.

Episode 19: Vlad the Impaler vs. Sun Tzu

Vlad the Impaler Team: Vaclav Havlik (Medieval Sword Master), Brahm Gallagher (Vlad Historian)
Vlad the Impaler Weapons: Kilij, Halberd, Steel Crossbow, Hand Cannon
Vlad the Impaler Armor: Plated Mail, Steel Helmet, Steel Shield
Vlad the Impaler Statistics: 1431-1476, Height: 5 Feet 9 Inches, Weight: 170 Pounds, Armor: Chain Mail, Steel Plates, Shield, Steel Helmet

Sun Tzu Team: Johnny Yang (Chinese Martial Arts Champ), Tommy Leng (Ancient Chinese Weapons Expert)
Sun Tzu Weapons: Jian, Zhua, Repeating Crossbow, Flaming Arrows
Sun Tzu Armor: Leather Lamellar, Bronze Helmet
Sun Tzu Statistics: 544-496 BC, Height: 5 Feet 7 Inches, Weight: 160 Pounds, Armor: Leather Lamellar, Shield, Bronze Helmet

This matchup is the most lopsided time-wise, with Sun Tzu traditionally believed to have been alive between 544–496 BC (during the Bronze Age), and Vlad III between 1431–1476 AD (during the Middle Ages), a difference of 1927 years between Sun Tzu's death and Vlad's birth.
For short-range weapons, the kilij was tested against the jian. The kilij cleanly sliced through a pig carcass with all of its four swings, leading the hosts to call it the only weapon they could compare to the katana. Meanwhile, the rapier-like jian could cleanly pierce through and cut up another pig carcass, piercing the aorta, and severing bone. The edge was given to the kilij for its devastating cutting power.
For mid-range weapons, the zhua (a solid iron pole with a claw) was tested against the halberd. The zhua tore apart a gel head in three strikes (causing a depressed fracture in every bone in the face), while the halberd pierced and ripped through the bones on a side of beef with the axe, hook, and pike portions of the blade, including severing 6 inches into the thickest part of the femur and piercing to the spinal cord. The edge was given to the halberd for its killing power and the flexibility of its hook, spike, and axe head.
For long-range weapons, the repeating crossbow was tested against the steel crossbow. The repeating crossbow fired 20 shots in the span of 30 seconds, and was shown capable of penetrating the chain part of Vlad's plated chainmail although it was a glancing wound. In all, the cross bow delivered seven hits. However, the steel crossbow could only get off two shots and delivered only one kill with the second bolt bouncing off Sun Tzu's leather armor. The edge was given to the repeating crossbow for its superior rate of fire.
For special weapons, the hand cannon was tested against the flaming arrow. The hand cannon was described as the most accurate black-powder weapon yet seen on the show. It delivered three kill shots and could be used as a spiked club if Vlad missed or ran out of ammunition. The flaming arrow could kill a group of enemies standing in a large sesame oil-soaked area of dry brush through severe fire burns or smoke inhalation but when it was tested directly against Vlad's plated chainmail armor, the first two shots bounced off the plates. A third shot only inflicted a shallow wound, with the flame actually aiding Vlad by stopping blood loss from the wound with the heat from the flame. The edge was given to the hand cannon for its firepower and secondary function as a melee weapon, as demonstrated by Gallagher.
Vlad's method of impalement was also demonstrated in this episode on a gel dummy. The stake was inserting through the posterior and, as gravity carried the body downward it pierced the lung and all major blood vessels in the torso before breaking the clavicle and exiting through the shoulder.
Vlad the Impaler was only the third warrior to receive the edge in 3 out of the 4 tests (the Maori Warrior and SWAT team being the others).
Vlad the Impaler is the first of two warriors who killed using non-factored methods in the simulation (coincidentally, the other warrior is the Vampire, which stems from Count Dracula, who was inspired by Vlad the Impaler).
This is the second of three episodes to have a warrior with at least one gunpowder-based weapon win over one who does not.

Reenactment 19

The battle starts out with Vlad sneaking up to Sun Tzu's campsite, where Sun Tzu has sat down to a cup of tea. Close by, Vlad sets his shield into the ground and readies his hand cannon, firing a shot which destroys the general's teapot. Vlad laughs as he has taken the general off guard, but Sun Tzu raises his repeating crossbow and gets off a few shots and runs away. Vlad ducks behind his shield but is struck in the shoulder. Relatively unharmed, Vlad pulls out the bolt and readies his hand cannon again, but Sun Tzu is nowhere to be seen. Collecting his effects (a steel helmet, his shield, and his halberd), Vlad runs off searching for Sun Tzu. But the general is not far away as he gets the drop on Vlad by shooting him from a tree with a flaming arrow. Vlad is thrown to the ground by the force of the shot, but still remains relatively unharmed as he scrambles to his feet while putting out the small fire. Sun Tzu jumps down from the tree, but is promptly stabbed in the thigh by Vlad's halberd. Sun Tzu yells in pain and strikes the halberd with the edge of his hand, breaking it at the head, astonishing Vlad. Sun Tzu kicks Vlad in the face while he is still distracted and pulls out the halberd, hobbling away as Vlad gets back up and collects his helmet and shield again. Not far away, Sun Tzu pulls out a spare set of his armor and a Zhua hidden underneath fallen foliage. Above him, the Impaler watches him, preparing his steel crossbow. Vlad walks a little ways and sees the general's armor nearby and takes his shot. The armor falls over and Vlad goes to investigate, only to find that he shot a decoy. The real general then jumps down, disarming Vlad from his shield using the Zhua. Vlad dodges another swing from the Zhua and draws his kilij, slashing Sun across the midsection as he recovers. The general falls back again, as Vlad pulls off his gauntlet, revealing that the Zhua managed to cut his forearm. The enraged Vlad picks up his kilij and charges Sun Tzu, who pulls out his Jian and clashes with the warrior king. Both warriors cross swords until when Sun Tzu thrusts, Vlad severs both of Tzu's hands at the wrist. The exhausted, crippled, and helpless general drops to his knees as Vlad raises his sword over his head, but stops in mid-swing from decapitating his victim. Grinning wildly with an evil laugh, Vlad has other ideas for the fallen general. A shot of the Wallachian countryside is shown as terrible sounds and screaming are heard off-screen. When the camera cuts back to the warriors, it is revealed that Vlad has impaled the defeated Sun Tzu on a large stake. Vlad places his sword in front of his face as an act of respect towards his fallen enemy and gives a loud victory roar as he raises his Kilij in the air.

Winner: Vlad the Impaler

Episode 20: Ming Warriors vs. French Musketeers

Ming Warrior Team: Jonathan Weizhang Wang (Kung Fu World Champion), Phillip Dang (Combative Wushu Champion)
Ming Warrior Weapons: Dao, 3-Barrel Pole Gun, Nest of Bees, Mechanical Landmine
Ming Warrior Armor: Leather Lamellar
Ming Warrior Statistics: 1368-1644, Height: 5 Feet 7 Inches, Weight: 150 Pounds, Armor: Leather Lamellar

French Musketeer Team: Xavier Declie (French Combat Historian), Luke Lafontaine (Sword Master)
French Musketeer Weapons: Rapier & Main Gauche, Wheel Lock Pistol, Flintlock Musket, Grenade
French Musketeer Armor: Steel Cuirass
French Musketeer Statistics: 1622-1776, Height: 5 Feet 9 Inches, Weight: 160 Pounds, Armor: Steel Cuirass

For short-range weapons, the rapier and main gauche combination was tested against the dao. The rapier/main gauche combo delivered five kill strikes against a gel torso in 16 seconds while the dao delivered five kill strikes against two pig carcasses in only seven seconds. The rapier struck through a synthetic eyeball (cutting it in half) and stabbed into the brain, stabbed the throat and severed the jugulars and the carotid artery, and stabbed between two ribs and pierced the heart. The main gauche stabbed into the abdomen and through the remaining synthetic eyeball and into the brain. The rapier's thrusting speed was measured at 5.9 feet per second, or roughly 4 mph. The dao perforated a pig carcass and was judged to hit the aorta and/or several vital organs if the same thrust was to be performed on a person, while the dao also cut two pig carcasses in half with two strikes each. The dao's thrusting speed was measured at roughly 4.9 mph. The edge was given to the dao since it could be used both for thrusting and slashing.
For mid-range weapons, the wheel lock pistol was tested against the 3-barrel pole gun against the other team's armor. The wheel lock pistol penetrated the Ming Warrior's studded leather armor and deliver three kill shots but misfired two times during its test while the 3-barrel pole gun was unable to penetrate the Musketeer's steel cuirass and could only inflict one kill and one wound. The edge was given to the wheel lock pistol due to the pole gun's failure.
For long-range weapons, the nest of bees was tested against the flintlock musket. Of the 32 rockets that were fired against a small battalion of dummy targets by the nest of bees, only six of them hit with three of them being kill shots while the flintlock musket fired off three shots and inflicted one kill and two wounds on a gel torso. The edge was given to the musket for its accuracy, heavy caliber, and option to mount a plug bayonet.
For special weapons, the mechanical landmine was tested against the grenade against four targets. The mechanical landmine killed all four of its targets upon detonation while the grenade only killed two of its targets and left the other two alive. The edge was given to the landmine for its larger explosive payload.
The French Musketeers are the ninth warriors of thirteen to win after scoring more kills at mid range and long range.
The dao is the fourteenth weapon to be given the edge and score fewer kills than the opposing weapon.

Reenactment 20

The battle starts with a band of five Musketeers making their way through a forest. Up ahead, four Ming Warriors emerge from a cave on a cliff, waiting for the Musketeers. A fifth is down below, setting up a Mechanically Triggered Land Mine and sticking a sword on top of it as bait. One of the Ming Soldiers opens up the Nest of Bees and launches a barrage of arrows at the Musketeers. The head Musketeer alerts his comrades, forcing them all to run back to avoid the arrows. One, however, is slow and is struck in the leg. He yanks the arrow from his leg and angrily throws it at the ground. Another Musketeer aims his musket at the head Ming Warrior. Just as the Ming Warrior makes his battle cry, the Musketeer shoots and kills him. The Musketeers then advance towards their enemy, with the one struck in the leg struggling to keep up. One of the Ming Warriors readies his 3-Barrel Pole Gun and fires at the Musketeers. One gets hit and knocked to the ground, but survives due to his armor stopping the projectile. The Ming Warrior prepares to fire another shot, but a Musketeer shoots him with the musket before he gets a chance. He falls over and rolls down the hill. The Musketeer shot by the Pole Gun is assisted in getting back onto his feet, only to be shot in the head by another Ming Warrior's Pole Gun. The Ming Warrior then retreats further back. A Musketeer sticks a bayonet onto his musket and walks up to the injured Ming Soldier, who is trying to unsheath his Dao. The Musketeer steps on him and jams the bayonet into him, killing him. The Musketeers regroup and continue to run after the three remaining Ming Warriors. The Ming Warrior that killed the first Musketeer desperately tries to escape, passing by the sword stuck in the ground. As the Musketeers chase him down, the injured one takes notice of the sword. Thinking that it would be of use later, he hobbles up to the sword and pulls it out. The land mine goes off and kills the Musketeer. The others see his bloody body and briefly mourn their dead friend before advancing toward the Ming Warriors. The Ming Warrior running from the Musketeers fires his Pole Gun again and kills a Musketeer. Another tries to shoot him with his musket, but misses. The Ming Warrior hides behind a rock and desperately tries to reload his weapon. The two remaining Musketeers hear him as they approach the rock. The Musketeer with the musket starts to go around the rock, but the leader stops him, pulling out a grenade. The first Musketeer smiles as he lights it with a match. The Musketeer hurls the Grenade over the rock, which blows up and kills the Ming Warrior. As the Musketeers look at his dead body while passing by, another Ming Warrior jumps out with his Dao sword and kills one of them with a strike to the neck. The head Musketeer tries to fire his Wheel Lock Pistol, but it winds up jamming. He throws it aside and pulls out his Rapier. The Ming Warrior tries to attack the Musketeer, but is shoved aside. The Ming Warrior tries again, but the Musketeer parries and stabs him in the stomach. The Ming Warrior falls to the ground and dies. The Musketeer hears a yell and turns around, only to find the head Ming Warrior standing on a cliff above him and also armed with a Dao, swinging it wildly. The Musketeer climbs up and engages the Ming Warrior in a duel. Eventually, the two fighters lock swords. The Musketeer uses this moment of opportunity to pull out his Main Gauche. He closes in and stabs the Ming Warrior in the stomach with the dagger. He pulls it out and allows the Ming Warrior to fall to his death. The Musketeer raises his sword and yells out "Vive le Roi!" (Long live the King!) in victory.

Winner: French Musketeers

Episode 21: Comanche vs. Mongol

Comanche Team: Joaquin Gonzalez (Comanche Horseman), Jay Redhawk (Master Horse Archer)
Comanche Weapons: War Hawk, War Lance, Bow & Arrow, Scalping Knife
Comanche Armor: Hair Pipe Breastplate, Buffalo Hide Shield
Comanche Statistics: Circa 1840, Height: 5 Feet 9 Inches, Weight: 145 Pounds, Armor: Buffalo Hide Shield and Bone Armor

Mongol Team: Munkhtur Luvsanjambaa (Native Mongol Historian), Jason Nguyen (Asian Combat Expert)
Mongol Weapons: Flanged Mace, Glaive, Bow & Arrow, Ild
Mongol Armor: Leather Lamellar, Leather Shield
Mongol Statistics: Circa 1225, Height: 5 Feet 5 Inches, Weight: 145 Pounds, Armor: Leather Lamellar

For short-range weapons, the war hawk was tested against the mace, the tests being performed on a ballistics gel skull flanked by two synthetic bone skulls, one of which had a pressure sensor attached to the crown. The war hawk delivered death blows to all three skulls in 32 seconds, piercing into the brainpans with a force of roughly 300 psi, while also stabbing upwards through the gel skull's cheekbone and into the lower portion of the brain, tearing off the top half of the skull. However, the war hawk was stuck for several seconds in the second bone skull and had to be shaken off before moving on to the ballistics skull. The iron flanged mace completely shattered all three skulls in 16 seconds, with a force of over 300 psi; Max Geiger claimed that the mace left a skull more unidentifiable than a shot from a 1-ounce slug, while Dr. Armand Dorian claimed that the torque of the strike meant that even a helmeted opponent would be killed due to a broken neck. The edge was given to the iron flanged mace for its tremendous killing power.
For mid-range weapons, the war lance was tested against the glaive. The war lance was tested from horseback against two stand-ins on foot and a ballistics gel torso mounted on a horse stand-in; striking at 40 mph at the point of impact, the war lance stabbed all three targets at the bottom of the heart, the tip reaching the spinal cord on the gel torso. Against a second gel torso that was clad in a Mongol's hardened leather cuirass, the war lance actually penetrated deeper than against naked ballistics gel, striking 10-12 inches beneath the ribcage. The glaive was tested on a horse-shaped slab of beef which was mounted on a zip-line to simulate motion, stabbing between the ribs at 32 mph and delivering a blow which would have struck the heart and/or the lungs on an actual horse. Although the glaive had a longer tip, the edge was given to the war lance since the glaive could not be used on horseback.
For long-range weapons, the Comanche bow was tested against the Mongol bow against seven targets. The Comanche bow delivered six hits and achieved four kills and one wound in 28s and was capable of firing three arrows at once. The Mongol bow delivered five hits and achieved four kills in 33s. Both archers had one missed shot. The edge was given to the Comanche bow for its speed and accuracy.
For special weapons, the ild short sword was tested against the scalping knife. The ild cut apart a pig carcass in 10 strikes, visually severing the ribcage and spinal cord. The ild's striking speed was clocked at 67 miles per hour. The scalping knife disemboweled another pig carcass with several strikes, inflicting wounds on the torso which would have inflicted a collapsed lung on a human target (but would not have been instant kills in and of themselves), stabbing into the neck and striking the jugular vein and/or carotid artery, and disembowelling the pig with a dragging vertical slice down the abdomen. The scalping knife's stabbing speed was clocked at roughly 30 miles per hour, with Geoff Desmoulins claiming that the hand speed of the Comanche expert was faster; however, the precise data was never divulged. Before the test, the Comanche expert also demonstrated a scalping on a synthetic skull that was dressed in synthetic skin and hair; however, only the visual was displayed, with no information on the potential deadliness of the scalping. The edge was given to the ild sword for its bigger size and cutting power.
The Mongol is one of three warriors to get at least 100 kills with each weapon, and is the only warrior to lose while doing so.
The Comanche is the tenth of thirteen warriors to win after scoring more kills at mid range and long range.
The flanged mace is the fifteenth weapon to be given the edge and score fewer kills than the opposing weapon.

Reenactment 21

In a valley, the Mongol is sharpening his Ild sword. Nearby, the Comanche cautiously makes his way to the top of the ridge overlooking the valley. The Mongol, feeling as if he's being watched, looks to the top of the ridge. Seeing nothing, he goes back to sharpening his Ild. Back up on the ridge, the Comanche readies his bow and arrow and fires downward to the unsuspecting Mongol. The arrow lands a foot away from the Mongol, startling him. He stands up and looks to the source of the arrow, but is unable to make it out due to the Comanche standing against the sun. Using this opportunity, the Comanche fires two more arrows at the blinded Mongolian, one which flies past him and another which lands right in front of him. The Comanche raises his bow and gives off a loud war cry and falls back. Gathering his senses, the Mongol sheaths his Ild and mounts his horse, while the Comanche thrusts his War Lance into the ground and slings his War Hawk on his back. The Mongol reaches the top of the hill, but is confused when he only finds the Comanche's horse. Hanging off the side of the horse, the Comanche pulls himself up to reveal himself, takes aim with his bow and arrow, and shoots the Mongol in the chest. The Mongol is saved by his lamellar breastplate however, as he angrily thrusts his glaive into the ground and pulls out the arrow. The Comanche rides ahead to set up another attack while the Mongol pulls out his bow and arrow. The Comanche rides past as the Mongol fires another shot, which barely misses him. The Comanche rides up to his War Lance, which he pulls out of the ground and hides into the bushes. The Mongol rides up to his glaive and pulls it out, seeing the Comanche's horse up on the rocky outcropping. The Mongol starts to ride to the abandoned horse when the Comanche ambushes him by tackling him from a rock, throwing him from his horse. The Comanche assumes a battle stance while the Mongol gathers himself and his Glaive. The Mongol swings his glaive but is parried by the Comanche's War Lance. The Mongol counters by slashing at the Comanche's back. The Comanche rolls, dropping his lance as he also avoids a circular slash. The Mongol goes in for a thrust, but the Comanche grabs the glaive and avoids the attack and counters with an elbow strike to the Mongol's head. The Comanche stomps on the glaive, breaking it as the Mongol gets back up and unsheathes his Ild. The Comanche pulls out his War Hawk and the two warriors clash. The Mongol deflects a swing and counters, slashing the Comanche's forearm. The Mongol goes in for a follow-up swing while the Comanche is still stunned, but the Comanche counters by grabbing the arms of the Mongol and hitting the Ild out of his hands, then spinning around and digging the War Hawk into the back of the Mongol. The Mongol pushes the War Hawk away as the Comanche gets it out and front kicks the Comanche, knocking him to the ground. The Comanche recovers and runs off into a cave while the Mongol runs back to his horse to retrieve his Flanged Mace and follows the Comanche into the cave. Inside the cave, the Mongol slowly searches out the Comanche, who has his back to a wall and is holding his War Hawk as well as a Scalping Knife. The Mongol spots the Comanche and swings his mace, which impacts on the cave wall as the Comanche dodges. The Mongol takes aim and swings the heavy mace again, hitting the floor as the Comanche dodges and gets set up for a counter-attack. The Comanche goes in for a swing with the War Hawk, but the Mongol counters with a swing that hits the Native American in the back, sending him reeling. The Mongol swings again, but the Comanche ducks under and quickly stabs the Mongol in the side with his Scalping Knife. The Mongol goes in for another swing, but misses as the Comanche ducks and goes in for two more stabs. While the Mongol is stunned, the Comanche grabs his War Hawk and buries it into the neck of the Mongol. The Mongol slumps to the cave floor, dead as the Comanche removes his hat and cuts off the Mongol's scalp with his Scalping Knife. Victorious, the Comanche stumbles out of the cave mouth, shouting as he holds the bloody scalp on high.

Winner: Comanche

Episode 22: Navy SEALs vs. Israeli Commandos

Navy SEAL Team: Rob Roy (22 Year SEAL Veteran), Colin Palmer (Former SEAL Explosives Expert)
Navy SEAL Weapons: Recon 1 Knife, SIG Sauer P226, M4 Colt Commando, C4
Navy SEAL Armor: Combat Helmet
Navy SEAL Statistics: Est. 1961, Force Size: Approx 2000, Height: 6 Feet, Weight: 185 Pounds

Israeli Commando Team: Moti Horenstein (Israeli Special Forces Instructor), Mike Kanarek (Israeli Special Forces Veteran)
Israeli Commando Weapons: KA-BAR Knife, Glock 19, Micro Galil, Semtex 
Israeli Commando Armor: KASDA Helmet
Israeli Commando Statistics: Est. 1957, Force Size: Classified, Height: 5 Feet 10 Inches, Weight: 180 Pounds

This is the second match-up where the competitors are allies who train with each other in real life (the first being SWAT vs. GSG9).
For short-range weapons, the KA-BAR was tested against the Recon 1 in cutting up a gel torso. Mike, wielding the KA-BAR, ripped apart the gel torso with a stabbing speed of 29fps (severing the windpipe, the spinal cord, and every major blood vessel in the neck, starting with an initial kill shot to an artery) while Rob, wielding the Recon 1, decapitated, amputated, and disemboweled the gel torso with a stabbing speed of 32fps. Both men's stabbing speed was determined to be slightly less than the punching speed of the average Olympic boxer. The panel was indecisive as to which knife was better and considered both weapons to be equally effective, resulting in a draw.
For mid-range weapons, the Glock 19 was tested against the SIG Sauer P226 in breaking five lights and eliminating two targets inside a mock-up bistro. The SEALS completed the challenge in 13.84s while the Commandos completed the challenge in 20.03s due to missing with a few shots against the lights. The edge was given to the SIG P226 for the better shooting of the SEALS.
For long-range weapons, the Micro Galil was tested against the M4 Colt Commando in hitting a moving pig target surrounded by four bystanders. The M4 hit the pig target with all 30 rounds in 34s while the Micro Galil fired only 23 rounds in 48s, achieving 21 hits and two grazes. The edge was given to the M4 for its accuracy, faster rate of fire, and tighter grouping.
For explosive weapons, the C4 was tested against the Semtex. In the first round of testing, the C4 destroyed a boat along with the two targets that were on it while a Semtex-laced cellphone killed its target without harming four nearby bystanders. In the second round of testing, 1 lb of each explosive was detonated in two separate wooden outhouses with the C4 generating ~270 psi and the Semtex generating ~324psi. The edge was given to the Semtex for its greater explosive force.
There was one final test comparing the hand-to-hand techniques of the two; the Commando's Krav Maga and the SEALs' Close Quarters Defense (CQD). Despite this, the results were neither shown nor factored into the simulation.
This is the sixth episode to have a tie in weapons edges.
Both warriors did not use one of their weapons in the final battle (the SEALs did not use their knives and the Israelis did not use their pistols).
This episode also marks the first time in a simulated squad battle that one combatant was able to take out two enemies at once, and is the only instance of doing so to win.
This is the closest match in season two.
The Navy Seals are the eleventh warrior of thirteenth to win after scoring more kills at mid range and long range.

Reenactment 22

The battle begins with the Navy SEALs coming up to a power plant occupied by the Israeli Commandos. One of the Navy SEALs spots an Israeli Commando patrolling on a walkway above him and shoots him with his M4 Colt Commando. The single SEAL regroups with his squad and infiltrates the facility through the a tower into the basement while the rest of the Commandos fire at them from the balcony. Inside the basement, the SEALs break off into a 2-man unit and a 3-man unit, while a 3-man unit of Commandos heads into the basement. As the two Navy SEALs make their way through the underbelly of the building, two Israeli Commandos set up an explosive trap with a glob of Semtex stuck to it and attach it to a string, which is attached to a doorknob. The two Navy SEALs come up to the door from the other side. One jiggles the door knob to ensure that it's unlocked, and the two open the door to charge in. The door pulls on the string and sets off the Semtex, instantly killing one of the Navy SEALs and throwing the other to the floor. He struggles to get up, but the other Israeli Commando seizes the opportunity and finishes him with his Micro Galil before he can get back up. Up above, the 3-man SEAL group emerges from a doorway. An Israeli Commando makes his way down a flight of stairs trying to aim his Micro Galil from the sights, but a SEAL who already has a bead on him shoots and kills him with his M4 Colt Commando. The Commando tumbles down the stairs as he is shot. The three other Commandos burst from a doorway and engage the Navy SEALs, burst-firing their Micro Galils and hitting the SEAL who falls over. The other two grab him and pull him away to safety while trying to ward off the Israeli Commandos off with gunfire. Under cover, the other two SEALs check their friend for signs of life, but the SEAL is already gone. The two remaining Navy SEALs enter another building, while the Israeli Commandos regroup and follow them through the door. Both squads emerge in different locations as the SEALs come up a flight of stairs near a turbine, while the Commandos weave their way through various machines. The Israeli Commando leader stops and signals both of his men to move forward, while on the other side, the Navy SEALs come to an open area. The SEAL leader signals for his friend to stop. He kneels down behind the turbine as the leader runs into the open area. The Commando leader comes up on the SEAL leader and tries to shoot him, but his Micro Galils jams and is rendered useless. The Navy SEAL leader runs across the open area, drawing and exchanging fire with the other two Commandos. The SEAL behind the turbine pops out and shoots a Commando in the head with his Colt Commando. The Israeli Commando next to him sees him die, but shrugs it off. The leader runs down a flight of stairs, drawing the attention of the Commando. The Navy SEAL races towards him, but is surprise-attacked by the lead Israeli Commando. The Commando throws him against the turbine, and blocks the SEAL's attempt to fight back and then pulls out his Ka-Bar Knife. He slashes the SEAL's throat and stabs it into his chest. The SEAL hangs on to the Commando leader as he slumps to the floor, and the Commando pats him on the head. The two Israeli Commandos regroup then proceed to run after the last Navy SEAL, who has retreated back into the basement. Downstairs, the Navy SEAL pulls out a C4 charge and slaps it behind a set of pipes. He quickly sets up the detonator and then hides in the back and waits for the Israeli Commandos. They soon arrive and slowly move about, searching for the Navy SEAL. The Navy SEAL then gets an idea and pulls out his Sig Sauer P226. The two Israeli Commandos hear a gunshot and try to find its source, unaware that the Navy SEAL is trying to lure them towards the C4. The Israeli Commandos pass through the pipes, and the Navy SEAL activates the C4, blowing it up and sending both the Israeli Commandos and the SEAL to the floor. The Navy SEAL quickly gets up and points his Sig Sauer P226 at the two Israeli Commandos, waiting for one of them to make their move. However, it is soon apparent that both soldiers were killed by the C4 blast. He raises his gun up and gives a quick shout in victory.

Winner: Navy SEALs

See also

Deadliest Warrior (season 1)
Deadliest Warrior (season 3)

References 

2010 American television seasons
Cultural depictions of Attila the Hun
Cultural depictions of Alexander the Great
Cultural depictions of Jesse James
Cultural depictions of Al Capone
Cultural depictions of Vlad the Impaler
Cultural depictions of Sun Tzu